Lancashire School of Business and Enterprise (previously known as Lancashire Business School) at the University of Central Lancashire (UCLan) is a business school based in the city of Preston, Lancashire, England.  It is located in a building at the heart of UCLan’s campus, close to the city centre.

Courses
The Lancashire School of Business and Enterprise delivers courses at undergraduate and postgraduate levels, including an MBA and its flagship programme Doctor of Business Administration, as well as offering bespoke programmes to businesses and organisations. Its academic programmes are supported by links with the business world.

Research
Nearly a third of the research conducted at Lancashire School of Business and Enterprise was rated as world-leading or of international significance in the recent Research Assessment Exercise RAE (2008). It is also home to six Research Institutes.

Accreditations
A number of the school's programmes have received accreditation from professional bodies, allowing either a joint award to be made on completion of a degree course, or direct entry to or advanced standing on professional qualifications.
 The Association of Chartered Certified Accountants (ACCA)
 Chartered Institute of Management Accountants (CIMA)
 Chartered Institute of Marketing (CIM)
 Chartered Institute of Public Relations (CIPR)
 Chartered Institute of Personnel & Development (CIPD)
 SAP University Alliance

The Lancashire School of Business and Enterprise is a member of the Chartered Association of Business Schools (CABS) and the European Foundation for Management Development (EFMD).

References

External links
 Lancashire School of Business and Enterprise official site

Business schools in England
University of Central Lancashire